Unnatural Selection is the third full-length album by thrash metal band Havok. It was released on June 25, 2013 by Candlelight Records.

Track listing

Personnel 
Havok
 David Sanchez – lead vocals, rhythm guitar
 Reece Scruggs – lead guitar, backing vocals
 Mike Leon – bass
 Pete Webber – drums

Additional personnel
 Terry Date - mixing

Charts

References 

2013 albums
Havok (band) albums
Candlelight Records albums